Aleksandr Filippov may refer to:

 Aleksandr Filippov (cyclist), Russian cyclist
 Aleksandr Filippov (footballer) (1892–1962), Russian footballer
 Aleksandr Filippov (historian) (1853–1927), historian, former Rector of Tartu University (1901–03)
 Aleksandr Filippov (philosopher) (1891–), Russian philosopher
Sasha Filippov (1925–1942), Soviet spy